This is a list of diplomatic missions of Sultanate of Oman

Excluded from this listing are honorary consulates and trade missions (with the exception of the commercial office in Taipei, which serves as Oman's de facto embassy to Taiwan).

Current missions

Africa

Americas

Asia

Europe

Oceania

Multilateral organizations

Gallery

Closed missions

Africa

Asia

See also
 Ministry of Foreign Affairs (Oman)
 Foreign relations of Oman
 List of diplomatic missions in Oman
 Visa policy of Oman

Notes

References

External links
Ministry of Foreign Affairs of Oman

Diplomatic missions of Oman
Diplomatic missions
Oman